Cesáreo Quezadas (born 18 December 1950) is a Mexican actor. He took the stage name of Pulgarcito from the film of the same name in which he debuted in 1957. During the 1960s he achieved worldwide fame for acting in many films. However, in 2005, he was sentenced 20 years in prison for sexually abusing his own daughter.

Biography
Cesáreo Quezadas made his film debut at the age of seven in a film by René Cardona called Pulgarcito in the reissue of the famous story of the Brothers Grimm. Due to the success of his interpretation and already known with the nickname of Pulgarcito he starred in so many films by René Cardona and brothers Miguel M. Delgado and Agustín P. Delgado, generally in the role of a rogue boy, orphaned and needy, with an angelic and sarcastic look impudence. In 1961 the film director Luis Lucía takes him to Spain to star, along with Marisol, The film An angel has arrived, which supposes the cusp of his race. Following the classic pattern of other children artists, in the mid-60's Cesáreo Quesazas sees his cinematographic career begin to decline as he loses the childish candor that characterized him, even so, in 1966 stars in two other films Duel of gunmen and El False hei, again with Joselito.

His later films suppose the total decadence with very secondary roles and even mere cameos, causing Pulgarcito to fall into a spiral of delinquency that takes to him to perpetrate a robbery the 20 January 1971. Almost at the end of the day, with the face Covered by a woolen balaclava and carrying a gun, Quezadas enters unnoticed in the shoe store El Taconazo and to the cry of "This is an assault!" Surprised the clerk, who at that moment faints. Believing that she is dead, Cesáreo Quezadas Cubillas is allowed to stop and is taken to the Federal District Attorney's Office, where he is interrogated and confesses his crime.

Once rehabilitated and together with his first wife, Beatriz, he set up a printing company. From this first marriage are his four children César, Marisol, Mariana and Beatriz. Later he maintains an affair with his secretary, Claudia, and his wife files a voluntary divorce suit accusing him of adultery. From his second marriage are his sons Gridley and Guillermo, but their relationship with Claudia becomes stormy and this, designer and photographer, ends up discovering a video of Quecidas sexually abusing his daughter Mariana. On April 30, 2005, a judge in the city of Mérida, Yucatán sentenced him to 20 years in prison and he is still,  in El Cereso de Yucatán.

References

1950 births
Mexican male actors
Living people